Jesse Campbell (born 29 August 1989) is a New Zealand eventing rider.

Born in Waikato, Campbell moved to the United Kingdom in 2010. He and his wife, fellow eventer Georgie Strang, were married in 2020, and live in Marlborough. They run stables in Ramsbury, Wiltshire. Campbell was a reserve for the New Zealand's eventing team at the 2018 World Equestrian Games in Tryon, North Carolina.

In June 2021, Campbell was confirmed on the New Zealand squad to compete at the delayed 2020 Summer Games in Tokyo, riding Diachello.

References

External links
 

1988 births
Living people
New Zealand male equestrians
New Zealand event riders
Sportspeople from Waikato
Equestrians at the 2020 Summer Olympics
Olympic equestrians of New Zealand